The 2002 season was the 72nd completed season of Finnish Football League Championship, known as the Veikkausliiga. At the same time it was the 13th season of the Veikkausliiga. This season three teams could promote from the 2nd division and only one would relegate, because the Veikkausliiga would extend its number of participating teams from 12 to 14, starting the 2003 season.

Overview
The Veikkausliiga is administered by the Finnish Football Association and the competition's 2002 season was contested by 12 teams. Following the Preliminary Stage, the higher eight teams progressed to the Championship Group while the lower four teams competed in the promotion/relegation group with the higher 4 teams from the Ykkönen. HJK Helsinki won the championship and qualified for the 2003–04 UEFA Champions League qualification round, while the second and third placed teams qualified for the first qualification round of the 2003–04 UEFA Cup. The fourth placed team qualified for the UEFA Intertoto Cup 2002, while VPS Vaasa were relegated to the Ykkönen.

Participating clubs 
In 2002 there were 12 participants in the Veikkausliiga:

 Allianssi Vantaa - previously Atlantis Helsinki
 FC Jazz Pori 
 FC Hämeenlinna - Promoted from Ykkönen
 FC Lahti 
 Haka Valkeakoski 
 HJK Helsinki 
 Inter Turku 
 Jaro Pietarsaari - Promoted from Ykkönen  
 KuPS Kuopio
 MyPa 47 Anjalankoski 
 Tampere United
 VPS Vaasa

Preliminary stage

Table

Results

Final stage

Championship group

Table

Results

Relegation group

Table

Leading scorers

Footnotes

References
Finland - List of final tables (RSSSF)

Veikkausliiga seasons
Fin
Fin
1